The Great Lockdown has been used to refer to a number of topics related to the COVID-19 pandemic:
 The pandemic as a whole
 COVID-19 lockdowns
 Travel restrictions related to the COVID-19 pandemic
 COVID-19 recession